Joseph R. Younglove (July 5, 1893 – May 1978) was an American politician who served in the New York State Assembly from the Fulton-Hamilton district from 1941 to 1964.

References

1893 births
1978 deaths
Republican Party members of the New York State Assembly
20th-century American politicians